Louis I, called the Lame (1279 – 22 January 1341) was a French prince du sang, Count of Clermont-en-Beauvaisis and La Marche and the first Duke of Bourbon, as well as briefly the titular King of Thessalonica from 1320 to 1321.

Life
Louis was born in Clermont-en-Beauvaisis, the son of Robert, Count of Clermont, and a grandson of King Louis IX of France. Louis' mother was Beatrix of Burgundy, heiress of Bourbon and a granddaughter of Hugh IV, Duke of Burgundy.

He fought on the losing side at the Battle of the Golden Spurs (1302) and at the Battle of Mons-en-Pévèle (1304), but managed to escape unharmed. In 1310, he was made Grand Chambrier of France. Louis was crucesignatus in 1316 founding a confraternity called the Holy Selpulchre. On 13 September 1318, Philip V of France designated Louis, who had drawn up a preliminary crusading plan, as captain-general of his crusading army, however the loss of the Franco-Papal fleet in 1319 to the Ghibbelines at Genoa sidelined their efforts.

On 14 April 1320, Louis offered 40,000 livres to Odo IV, Duke of Burgundy for the rights to the title King of Thessalonica, however Philip of Taranto stepped in and offered the same amount which Odo accepted. The terms of the agreement also included the marriage of Philip's oldest son and Louis' daughter, Beatrice.

In 1327, Charles IV of France persuaded Louis to exchange the County of Clermont for that of La Marche, and elevated Bourbon to a duchy-peerage. By 1331, Clermont was restored to him since he was part of Philip VI's small circle of trusted advisors. Louis continued to be an integral part of French crusading plans until 1336, when Pope Benedict XII cancelled Philip VI's crusade.

Duke Louis is reported to have been somewhat mentally unstable, in particular having nervous breakdowns. The trait is believed to have been hereditary, with his granddaughter Joanna of Bourbon, her son, King Charles VI of France, and Charles' grandson, King Henry VI of England, all displaying similar symptoms.

He was buried in the now-demolished church of the Couvent des Jacobins in Paris.

Family and children
In 1310, Louis married Mary of Avesnes, daughter of John II of Avesnes, Count of Hainaut and Holland by Philippa of Luxembourg. They had:
Peter I, Duke of Bourbon (1311–1356), married Isabella of Valois, had issue. Peter was killed at the Battle of Poitiers.
Joanna (1312–1402), married in 1324 Guigues VII, Count of Forez.
Margaret (1313–1362), married on 6 July 1320 Jean II de Sully, married in 1346 Hutin de Vermeilles.
Marie (1315–1387, Naples), married first in Nicosia in January 1330 Guy of Lusignan (d. 1343), titular Prince of Galilee, married second on 9 September 1347 Robert of Taranto, the titular Latin Emperor.
Philip (1316 – aft. 1327).
James (1318).
James I, Count of La Marche (1319 – 1362), killed at the Battle of Brignais.
Beatrice (1320 – 23 December 1383, Danvillers), married first at Vincennes in  1334 John of Luxembourg, King of Bohemia as his second wife, married secondly c. 1347 Eudes II of Grancey (d. 1389).

With Jeanne de Bourbon-Lancy, dame de Clessy, Louis had several illegitimate children:

 Jean (ca. 1297–1375), "bâtard de Bourbon", knight, seigneur of Rochefort, Ébreuil, Beçay le Guérant, Bellenave, Jenzat, Serrant and la Bure, advisor to the dukes of Berry and of Bourbon, lieutenant du Forez, married Agnès Chaleu for his third wife;
 "N" (eldest daughter), "bâtarde de Bourbon", married in 1317 to Girard of Châtillon-en-Bazois;
 Guy (vers 1299–1349), "bâtard de Bourbon", seigneur of Clessy, la Ferté-Chauderon and Montpensier (legitimized in 1346, but that same year he was again bastardized). Married in 1315 Agnès of Chastellus, then between 1330 and 1333 Isabelle of Chastelperron;
 Jeannette, "bâtarde de Bourbon", married in 1310 to Guichard of Chastellus.

References

Sources

1279 births
1341 deaths
14th-century peers of France
Counts of Clermont-en-Beauvaisis
Counts of La Marche
Dukes of Bourbon
House of Bourbon (France)
Princes of Achaea
Titular Kings of Thessalonica
Royalty and nobility with disabilities